Ralph Daniel Van Dyk (November 25, 1942 – November 29, 2004) was an American politician in the state of Washington. He served the 42nd district from 1971 to 1975.

References

1942 births
2004 deaths
Politicians from Bellingham, Washington
Democratic Party members of the Washington House of Representatives
Farmers from Washington (state)
20th-century American politicians